|}

The Prix Vanteaux is a Group 3 flat horse race in France open to three-year-old thoroughbred fillies. It is run over a distance of 1,850 metres (about 1 mile and 1¼ furlongs) at Longchamp in April or early May.

History
The event is named after the Vanteaux family, who were among France's first racehorse breeders. The family were based at the Saint-Jean-Ligoure stud farm in Haute-Vienne. The farm was initially run by Gabriel de Vanteaux (1779–1854), and then by his son Psalmet de Vanteaux (1822–1893).

The Prix Vanteaux was established in 1868, and it was originally run over 2,000 metres. It was abandoned because of the Franco-Prussian War in 1871. It was cancelled throughout World War I, with no running from 1915 to 1918.

The race was held at Maisons-Laffitte in 1944 and 1945. It was shortened to 1,950 metres in 1953. During the mid-1960s, it was contested over 1,850 metres (1963), 1,950 metres (1964) and 1,850 metres (1965–67). It was extended to 1,900 metres in 1968.

The present system of race grading was introduced in 1971, and the Prix Vanteaux was subsequently classed at Group 3 level. It was cut to 1,850 metres in 1987.

The event sometimes serves as a trial for the Prix de Diane. The last horse to win both races was Latice in 2004.

Records
Leading jockey (5 wins):
 R. Hunter – Regane (1872), Mondaine (1876), Linotte (1878), Willye (1882), Liria (1884)
 Charles Bouillon – Coriandre (1928), Vareuse (1933), Reine Isaure (1934), Asheratt (1938), Bulle de Savon (1939)

Leading trainer (7 wins):
 Criquette Head-Maarek – Three Troikas (1979), Harbour (1982), Fitnah (1985), Riviere d'Or (1988), Corrazona (1993), America (2000), Denomination (2009)
 André Fabre - Grise Mine (1984), Louveterie (1989), Qirmazi (1990), Bonash (1994), Luna Wells (1996), Esoterique (2013), Mqse De Sevigne (2022)

Leading owner (7 wins):
 Édouard de Rothschild – Floraison (1912), Honeysuckle (1922), Coriandre (1928), Vareuse (1933), Reine Isaure (1934), Asheratt (1938), Bulle de Savon (1939)

Winners since 1978

Earlier winners

 1868: Mousie
 1869: L'Oise
 1870: Sornette
 1871: no race
 1872: Regane
 1873: Spada
 1874: Poudriere
 1875: Confiance
 1876: Mondaine
 1877: Astree
 1878: Linotte
 1879: Venise
 1880: Voilette
 1881: Belgirate
 1882: Willye
 1883: Bichette
 1884: Liria
 1885: Bulgarie
 1886: Babel
 1887: Hervine
 1888: Verveine
 1889: Chopine
 1890: Liliane
 1891: Clarisse
 1892: Fantasia
 1893: Barbara
 1894: Floride
 1895: Picardia
 1896: Perouse
 1897: His First
 1898: Fee Printemps
 1899: Hasseki
 1900: Thebes
 1901: Rosine
 1902: Basse Terre
 1903: Senorita
 1904: Feuille de Chou
 1905: Ginette
 1906: Bethsaida
 1907: Franchise
 1908: Medeah
 1909: Loris
 1910: M'Amour
 1911: Tripolette
 1912: Floraison
 1913: Babette
 1914: Bobine
 1915–18: no race
 1919: Suavita
 1920: Meddlesome Maid
 1921: Durban
 1922: Honeysuckle
 1923: Royal Mistress
 1924: Isola Bella
 1925: Frisette
 1926: Rayon de Soleil
 1927: Lithography
 1928: Coriandre
 1929: Rollybuchy
 1930: Finsovino
 1931: Melianthe
 1932: Kiddie
 1933: Vareuse
 1934: Reine Isaure
 1935: Farfadette
 1936: Nymph
 1937: Nica
 1938: Asheratt
 1939: Bulle de Savon
 1940: Novalaise *
 1941: Longthanh
 1942: Infante
 1943: Bisbille
 1944: Palencia
 1945: Piva
 1946: Ephese
 1947: La Gerbe
 1948: Bettina
 1949: Double Rose
 1950: Camarée
 1951: Nadika
 1952: Parade d'Amour
 1953: Kypris
 1954: Haridelle
 1955: All Risk
 1956: Tour de Londres
 1957: Avilon
 1958: But Lovely
 1959: Favreale
 1960: Toscanella
 1961: Belle Shika
 1962: Gaspesie
 1963: Altissima
 1964: Dreida
 1965: La Sarre
 1966: Fermina
 1967: Casaque Grise
 1968: La Lagune
 1969: Fast Ride
 1970: Bon Appetit
 1971: Flamboyante
 1972: Dame des Ondes
 1973: Reine de Naples
 1974: Lady Rebecca
 1975: Sea Sands
 1976: Theia
 1977: Dekeleia

* Nuit de Noce finished first in 1940, but she was relegated to second place following a stewards' inquiry.

See also
 List of French flat horse races

References

 France Galop / Racing Post:
 france-galop.com – A Brief History: Prix Vanteaux.
 galop.courses-france.com – Prix Vanteaux – Palmarès depuis 1980.
 galopp-sieger.de – Prix Vanteaux.
 horseracingintfed.com – International Federation of Horseracing Authorities – Prix Vanteaux (2019).
 pedigreequery.com – Prix Vanteaux – Longchamp.

Flat horse races for three-year-old fillies
Longchamp Racecourse
Horse races in France
1868 establishments in France
Recurring sporting events established in 1868